"Slateman" is a song by industrial metal band Godflesh. It was released as a 7-inch single in 1991 through Sub Pop and later reissued on Earache Records as a CD, a 7-inch and a 12-inch. In 1996, the single was repackaged alongside  Cold World (1991) on one disc by Earache Records as the  compilation Slateman/Cold World. Both "Slateman" and its b-side, "Wound '91", were appended to the end of most issues of Godflesh's 1991 EP Slavestate.

Background
The song "Wound '91" is an updated version of the song "Wound" from the unreleased Tiny Tears EP, which was later appended as bonus tracks to the end of the CD version of Streetcleaner (1989). The single's cover photograph was taken during a 1991 gig in London where the band opened for Nirvana.

Critical reception
Ira A. Robbins of Trouser Press wrote, "The four-song Slavestate EP finds the band charging full-on into an industrial-dance realm, giving Streetcleaner'''s lurch-and-crunch the twist of a rhythmic basis. The concurrent "Slateman" single found that format mutated into yet another shape". Denise Falzon of Exclaim! described the live version of the song simply as "groovy". In 2023, Rolling Stone'' named "Slateman" the 51st best metal song of all time.

Track listing

Personnel
G.C. Green – bass guitar, production
J.K. Broadrick – guitar, vocals, production
Paul Neville – guitar
Machines – rhythm, samples
Jason Ashbridge – photography

References

1991 singles
Sub Pop singles
Godflesh songs
1991 songs